Play N Trade is an American franchisor operating in the video game and consumer electronics space, with an emphasis on video gaming lifestyle.  The company, whose headquarters are in San Clemente, California, United States currently operates stores throughout the United States, Canada, Panama and Egypt. Play N Trade has been referred to as "the fastest-growing video game retail franchise" in the United States,  and is the “second-largest specialty video game retail in the United States”. As of January 10, 2013, Play N Trade operates 116 franchised locations globally.

Play N Trade stores sell new and used consumer electronics, including video games and consoles, Apple products, laptops, and cellular phones, and accept trade-ins of the same. Services include video game rental, parties, tournaments, events, and gaming device repairs. Play N Trade is the first video game retailer to host weekly in-store tournaments, and also hosts corporate sponsored national tournaments. Most Play N Trade stores also carry vintage games and game consoles.

In 2007, Play N Trade was ranked in the Franchise 500 and New Franchise 50 by Entrepreneur Magazine and had doubling its nationwide stores in 2006. Entrepreneur Magazine also named Play N Trade one of the top ten new franchises for 2008.

Play N Trade was founded in 2000 by (now retired) founder Ron Simpson of Colorado Springs, Colorado. The current leadership team includes executives from the automotive industry, Walt Disney Imagineering, as well as several tech entrepreneurs in the wireless industry.  In Phoenix, many stores of Play N Trade have either been moved or shutdown.

References

Video game retailers of the United States
Retail companies established in 2000